The 2022  Women's PSA World Series Finals is the fourth women's edition of the PSA World Tour Finals (Prize money : $200,000) after the renaming of PSA World Series. The top 8 players in the 2021–22 PSA World Tour are qualified for the event. The event takes place at Mall of Arabia, Cairo in Egypt from 21–26 June 2022.

It's the fourth edition under the PSA World Tour Finals label after the PSA renamed PSA World Series to current PSA World Tour Finals. CIB remains as the title sponsor.

PSA World Ranking Points
PSA also awards points towards World Ranking. Points are awarded as follows:

Match points distribution
Points towards the standings are awarded when the following scores:

Qualification & Seeds

Qualification
Top eight players at 2021–22 PSA World Tour standings qualifies to Finals.

Seeds

Group stage results
Times are Eastern European Time (UTC+02:00). To the best of three games.

Group A

Standings

Group B

Standings

Knockout stage

Semifinal
To the best of three games.

Final
To the best of five games.

See also
2022 Men's PSA World Tour Finals
2021–22 PSA World Tour Finals

References

External links
PSA World Tour Finals at PSA website
PSA World Tour Finals official website

W
PSA World Tour Finals
PSA World Tour Finals